Captain Abu Raed is a 2007 Jordanian film directed and written by Amin Matalqa. It is the first feature film produced in Jordan in more than 50 years. The Royal Film Commission of Jordan endorsed Captain Abu Raed to be submitted to the 81st Academy Awards for Best Foreign Language Film, the first ever submitted by Jordan. The film won awards at numerous film festivals including the Sundance Film Festival, Heartland Film Festival, and the Dubai International Film Festival. It was screened at the Jerusalem International Film Festival in 2008.

Plot
Abu Raed is an airport janitor at the Queen Alia International Airport in Amman. After finding a Royal Jordanian captain's hat in the trash, the neighborhood children mistake him for an airline pilot and beg him to tell them stories of his adventures. At first refusing, he later concedes and tells them about his fictional travels to England, France, and New York, earning the name "Captain Abu Raed"

An older child, Murad, knows who Abu Raed really is and sets out to prove the other children wrong, repeating the phrase "People like us don't grow up to be pilots." With some dinars he found, Murad takes the other children on a taxi ride to the airport to show them the truth about Abu Raed. The children are heartbroken at seeing their idol on his hands and knees, scrubbing the floor.

It is later shown that Murad had stolen the money from his father Abu Murad, who, drunk after a hard day selling women's clothing on the street, often abused Murad's mother, Um Murad. Abu Murad was exceptionally mad about the loss of money and took it out on his wife.

Meanwhile, at the airport and on the bus home, Abu Raed gets to know Nour, a female pilot whose wealthy father poorly attempted to find her a husband. During a friendly visit to his home, he tells her about his past, including a deceased wife and son, Raed.

Abu Raed also had to deal with Tareq, one of the children whom he told stories to, whose father had him selling wafers on the street rather than going to school. Abu Raed knew he was a smart boy so he bought all of his wafers so Tareq could attend school. However, this was a mixed blessing as Abu Tareq would then give Tareq more wafers to sell, seeing as he was a good salesman.

Abu Raed, after being exposed as a phony, forgave Murad and gave him the pilot hat as a token of forgiveness. Later, Murad steals a model airplane and gets his hand burned by his father for it. Abu Raed is there to comfort him, creating a bond between the two. This event convinces Abu Raed to find a way to bring Murad, his younger brother, and his mother to safety.

After Abu Raed treats Murad's burns one night, Murad leaves, and so does Abu Raed. On his way home, he finds an intoxicated Abu Murad lying in the street, who tells Abu Raed to 'shut up'. Abu Raed lifts a heavy stone, considering ending the misery Abu Murad caused himself and his family. However, he is overcome by his feelings and leaves him unharmed. 

One night, before Abu Murad gets home, Abu Raed develops a plan to protect Murad and his family. Nour volunteers to take them in, because her wealthy family owns a large house. She brings her car to the living area where Abu Raed and the Murads live, and they hurriedly pack the belongings of the Murad family. As they are about to leave, Murad runs back to retrieve the pilot's cap, a symbol of his dreams and aspirations. Nour then sets off for her house, as Tareq appears and asks what is going on, to which Abu Raed replies, "Nothing." Tareq becomes the last person, other than a drunk Abu Murad, to see Abu Raed alive.

Despite repeated warnings from Um Murad that "He's going to kill you", Abu Raed sits in the Murad apartment and awaits Abu Murad's return. Upon finding his house empty, Abu Murad threatens Abu Raed's life. Abu Raed is implied to have been killed in that apartment. Years later, a grown-up Murad is seen watching the airfield as a Royal Jordanian pilot.

Setting
Many of the movie's open scenes are set on the well-known Roman ruins high above Amman, on Jabal al-Qal'a. The "Making of Captain Abu Raed" on the Western release of the DVD points out that although the movie takes place entirely in Amman and the airport, the neighborhood surrounding Abu Raed's home was shot in the neighboring old city of Salt.

Although the date of the movie is never specified by any notes or characters, the usage of the Eastern Arabic numerals on vehicles' license plates implies that the movie takes place in the past, as a recollection from youth by the adult Captain Murad. Jordan switched from the Eastern Arabic numeral system to standard Arabic numerals in the 1990s.

Cast
Nadim Sawalha – Abu Raed
Rana Sultan – Nour
Hussein Al-Sous – Murad
Udey Al-Qiddissi – Tareq
Ghandi Saber – Abu Murad
Dina Ra'ad-Yaghnam – Um Murad

Awards
Won
2007 Dubai International Film Festival
 Muhr Award – Best Actor: Nadim Sawalha
2008 Durban International Film Festival
Best First Feature Film
2008 Heartland Film Festival
Crystal Heart Award – Feature Film
Grand Prize for Dramatic Feature
2008 Newport Beach Film Festival
Jury Award – Best Actor – Nadim Sawalha
Jury Award – Best Actress – Rana Sultan
2008 Seattle International Film Festival
Best Director Golden Space Needle Award – Amin Matalqa
2008 Sundance Film Festival
Audience Award – World Cinema – Dramatic
9th AARP Movies for Grownups Awards
Best Foreign Film
Nominated
2008 Sundance Film Festival
Grand Jury Prize – World Cinema – Dramatic

See also
Cinema of Jordan
List of Jordanian submissions for the Academy Award for Best Foreign Language Film

References

External links
 
 
 
 Producer Nadine Toukan's journey
 Captain Abu Raed in Best of Jordan

2007 films
2007 drama films
Aviation films
Films shot in Jordan
Jordanian drama films
2000s Arabic-language films